Perry House may refer to:
 in Australia
 Perry House, Brisbane, heritage-listed building in Queensland
 in USA

Bass-Perry House, Seale, Alabama, listed on the National Register of Historic Places (NRHP) in Russell County
David Perry House, Bridgeport, Connecticut, listed on the NRHP in Fairfield County
Perry-Shockley House, Millsboro, Delaware, listed on the NRHP in Sussex County
Perry House (Lakeland, Florida), listed on the NRHP in Polk County
Durham-Perry Farmstead, Bourbonnais, Illinois, listed on the NRHP in Kankakee County
T.B. Perry House, Albia, Iowa, listed on the NRHP in Monroe County
Perry House (Perry, Louisiana), listed on the NRHP in Vermilion Parish
William F. Perry House, Bridgton, Maine, listed on the NRHP in Cumberland County
Clark Perry House, Machias, Maine, listed on the NRHP in Washington County
Perry Hall Mansion, Perry Hall, Maryland, listed on the NRHP in Baltimore County
Perry Point Mansion House and Mill, Perryville, Maryland, listed on the NRHP in Maryland
Perry-Cooper House, Salisbury, Maryland, listed on the NRHP in Wicomico County
James Perry House, Rehoboth, Massachusetts, listed on the NRHP in Bristol County
Warren Perry House, Lapeer, Michigan, listed on the NRHP in Lapeer County
Glenn and Addie Perry Farmhouse, Plattsmouth, Nebraska, listed on the NRHP in Cass County
Norman and Marion Perry House, Campton, New Hampshire, listed on the NRHP in Grafton County
Ivory Perry Homestead, Dublin, New Hampshire, listed on the NRHP in Cheshire County
John Perry Homestead, Dublin, New Hampshire, listed on the NRHP in Cheshire County
Perry-Petty Farmstead, Mansfield Township, New Jersey, listed on the NRHP in Warren County
Peter D. Perry House, Park Ridge, New Jersey, listed on the NRHP in Bergen County
Ezikial Perry House, Jerusalem, New York, listed on the NRHP in Yates County
Jacob P. Perry House, Pearl River, New York, listed on the NRHP in Rockland County
Dr. Samuel Perry House, Gupton, North Carolina, listed on the NRHP in Franklin County
Perry-Shepherd Farm, Lansing, North Carolina, listed on the NRHP in Ashe County
Perry-Cherry House, Mount Olive, North Carolina, listed on the NRHP in Wayne County
Perry-Spruill House, Plymouth, North Carolina, listed on the NRHP in Washington County
Perry Farm, Riley Hill, North Carolina, listed on the NRHP in Wake County
Heartsfield-Perry Farm, Rolesville, North Carolina, listed on the NRHP in North Carolina
Norman Dewey Perry House, Delaware, Ohio, listed on the NRHP in Delaware County
Jenkins-Perry House, Milan, Ohio, listed on the NRHP in Erie County
Commodore Oliver Perry Farm, South Kingstown, Rhode Island, listed on the NRHP in Washington County
Lewis-Card-Perry House, Westerly, Rhode Island, listed on the NRHP in Washington County
Perry Estate-St. Mary's Academy, Austin, Texas, listed on the NRHP in Travis County
Perry-Swilley House, Houston, Texas, listed on the NRHP in Harris County
Capt. William Perry House, Jefferson, Texas, listed on the NRHP in Marion County
A. F. Perry and Myrtle-Pitmann House, Lufkin, Texas, listed on the NRHP in Angelina County
C. W. Perry Archie-Hallmark House, Lufkin, Texas, listed on the NRHP in Angelina County
Perry Hill (Saint Joy, Virginia), listed on the NRHP in Buckingham County
Melvin W. and Mary Perry House, Algoma, Wisconsin, listed on the NRHP in Kewaunee County

See also
Parry House (disambiguation)